"Zakon ljubavi" (literally, The law of love) is a Croatian telenovela, which began screening on 22 September 2008 on Nova TV. The series was created by Roman Majetić and Nikola Ivanda, while the story was written by Jelena Veljača and Nataša Antulov. It was the first telenovela produced by AVA Production which screened o Nove TV.

Story 
The series follows in parallel two completely different worlds. Firstly, we are introduced to a group of younger adults who share a villa owned by the Perković family. 18-year-old Klara Bakić has just arrived in Zagreb to attend the audition for the Academy of Dramatic Arts in Zagreb. On the way to the faculty she becomes involved in a car accident which Ivor and Domagoj (Zagreb's elite youth) try to conceal. Sparks immediately fly between Klara and Domagoj.

Zagreb's acting world is contrasted with Zagreb's legal world, specifically the world of legal firm "Perković, Nardelli and partners". Two main families are combined through married between Petar Perkovića and Maja Lena Nardelli Perković. Maja Lena is an extremely successful young lawyer who had become partner within the legal firm of Petar's father Zvonimira, the most famous Zagreb lawyer with political-social connections, albeit questionable morals. Petar and Maja Lena are successful in their fields of law, and their marriage glows roses...from the outside. Petar is hiding an affair with acting diva Lucija Nardelli who is married to Maja Lena's brother, theatre director Matej Nardelli.

Quickly Maja Lena uncovers Petar's infidelity and throws him out of the family villa, and rents it to a group of student-actors as a means of revenge, betting on their varied parties and anticipated financial problems, knowing that Petar is sensitive to the like. Apart from the new flatmates Ivor, Kare and Domagoj, the house is home to Una Perković, Petar's younger sister who is unhappily fails her exams at the Academy of Dramatic Arts, and does everything in her power to make Klara's stay in the Villa bitter. That aside, because of her aspiring dreams she enters into a relationship with Metej in order to use him. Stella, Maja Lena's young assistant and legal assistant in the law firm Perković, also lives in the Villa. On the outside she appears to be a calm young lady but in actuality is a skillful manipulator who, together with mysterious Andrej, secretly investigate the Perković law firm.

Characters

Perković Family 
 Zvonimir Perković - rich and ambitious 50-year-old who loves to control all; father of Una and Petar.
 Neva Perković - lonely mother who everyone has forgotten, finds happiness through alcoholism.
 Petar Perković - Zvonimir's son who is cheating on his wife Maja lena with Lucija. Lazy and a lady's man.
 Una Perković - rich and arrogant teenager; former model, desires success in acting.

Nardelli Family 
 Ignjat Nardelli - rich 50-year-old who is in a large divide with Zvonimir.
 Alma Sach Nardelli - Mother of Maja Lena and Matej; successful architect.
 Maja Lena Nardelli - good, but a deceived women; successful as a lawyer and words Zvonimir's law firm; small romance with Ivor.
 Matej Nardelli - A lecturer at the Academy of Dramatic Arts; his wife Lucija is cheating on him with Petar.
 Lucija Nardelli - Matej's arrogant wife; untrustworthy and unthankful; has been acting since her 20s.

Other characters 
 Domagoj Rebac - Young male who needs a soul mate; in love with Klara and is a former drug dealer.
 Ivor Vilić - a typical 20-year-old; loves gorgeous women, fun and crazy; has a romance with Maja Lena.
 Klara Bakić - a good young-girl who strives to gain acceptance at the Academy of Dramatic Arts; has potential and because of that Una is extremely jealous; wants to become friends with Una who isn't the type for friendship.
 Tonka - Zvonimir's law firm secretary and best friend of Maja Lena who shares all her secrets.
 Stella - an employee of Zvonimir's; young and a little inexperienced; romance with Andrej.
 Andrej - Stella's boyfriend who wishes to know all about Maja Lena.
 Peter Tadic - Is from out of town and seems intent on causing trouble Zvonimir's law firm.

Trivia 
 On the premier day of the telenovela "Zakon Ljubavi", on the competitor Channel HRT also began another Croatian telenovela "Sve će biti dobro". Even though both telenovela's shared stable ratings from the start, after the first month of screening, viewers leaned more towards HRT's telenovela, based on viewer ratings printed in the Jutarnji list. "Sve će biti dobro" follows daily 12% of viewers, where as for "Zakon ljubavi" sided only 6%.
 Marijana Mikulić acting the character "Zrinke Kramarić", former singer who is in the process of divorce with her partner after he finds out about her infidelity and who throws her clothes through the window of their city apartment. This event in the series shares close resemblance to the case of singer Vlatka Pokos. Even though author Jelena Veljača denied that the events in the telenovela are inspired on Vlatka's divorce, Vlatka Pokos became quite upset at Jelena since she was certain how her situation was portrayed to the detail in the telenovela.
 Due to the unfulfillment of contractual obligations, namely breaching contract, Roman Majetić in October 2008 fired one of the main writers  Jelenu Veljaču. She was replaced by Serbian writer Nataša Drakulić.
 Nova TV (Croatia) due to low ratings decided to stop purchasing the telenovela "Zakon Ljubavi" after 60 screened episodes. The series was replaced by re-runs of the comedy series "Bumerang".

Actors

Main Cast

References

External links

2008 telenovelas
2008 Croatian television series debuts
2008 Croatian television series endings
Croatian television soap operas
2000s Croatian television series
Nova TV (Croatia) original programming
Pop (Slovenian TV channel) original programming